Pyatnitsky (masculine), Pyatnitskaya (feminine), or Pyatnitskoye (neuter) is the name of several inhabited localities in Russia.

Modern localities
Urban localities
Pyatnitskoye, Belgorod Oblast (also known as Pyatnitskaya), a work settlement in Volokonovsky District of Belgorod Oblast; 

Rural localities
Pyatnitsky, Orlovsky District, Oryol Oblast, a settlement in Maslovsky Selsoviet of Orlovsky District in Oryol Oblast; 
Pyatnitsky, Soskovsky District, Oryol Oblast, a settlement in Lobyntsevsky Selsoviet of Soskovsky District in Oryol Oblast; 
Pyatnitskoye, Bryansk Oblast, a selo in Selilovichsky Rural Administrative Okrug of Rognedinsky District in Bryansk Oblast; 
Pyatnitskoye, Babyninsky District, Kaluga Oblast, a selo in Babyninsky District of Kaluga Oblast
Pyatnitskoye, Spas-Demensky District, Kaluga Oblast, a selo in Spas-Demensky District of Kaluga Oblast
Pyatnitskoye, Kursk Oblast, a selo in Znamensky Selsoviet of Gorshechensky District in Kursk Oblast
Pyatnitskoye, Izmalkovsky District, Lipetsk Oblast, a selo in Pyatnitsky Selsoviet of Izmalkovsky District in Lipetsk Oblast; 
Pyatnitskoye, Krasninsky District, Lipetsk Oblast, a selo in Sotnikovsky Selsoviet of Krasninsky District in Lipetsk Oblast; 
Pyatnitskoye, Nizhny Novgorod Oblast, a village in Ogibnovsky Selsoviet under the administrative jurisdiction of the town of oblast significance of Semyonov in Nizhny Novgorod Oblast; 
Pyatnitskoye, Oryol Oblast, a selo in Bogoroditsky Selsoviet of Khotynetsky District in Oryol Oblast; 
Pyatnitskoye, Bashmakovsky District, Penza Oblast, a selo in Sheremetyevsky Selsoviet of Bashmakovsky District in Penza Oblast
Pyatnitskoye, Pachelmsky District, Penza Oblast, a crossing loop in Sheynsky Selsoviet of Pachelmsky District in Penza Oblast
Pyatnitskoye, Smolensk Oblast, a village in Oktyabrskoye Rural Settlement of Krasninsky District in Smolensk Oblast
Pyatnitskoye, Kireyevsky District, Tula Oblast, a selo in Bolshekalmyksky Rural Okrug of Kireyevsky District in Tula Oblast
Pyatnitskoye, Varfolomeyevsky Rural Okrug, Leninsky District, Tula Oblast, a selo in Varfolomeyevsky Rural Okrug of Leninsky District in Tula Oblast
Pyatnitskoye, Zaytsevsky Rural Okrug, Leninsky District, Tula Oblast, a village in Zaytsevsky Rural Okrug of Leninsky District in Tula Oblast
Pyatnitskoye, Maksatikhinsky District, Tver Oblast, a village in Malyshevskoye Rural Settlement of Maksatikhinsky District in Tver Oblast
Pyatnitskoye, Rzhevsky District, Tver Oblast, a village in Medvedevo Rural Settlement of Rzhevsky District in Tver Oblast
Pyatnitskoye, Toropetsky District, Tver Oblast, a village in Skvortsovskoye Rural Settlement of Toropetsky District in Tver Oblast
Pyatnitskoye, Vesyegonsky District, Tver Oblast, a village in Kesemskoye Rural Settlement of Vesyegonsky District in Tver Oblast

Alternative names
Pyatnitskoye, alternative name of Pyatnitsa, a village in Sokolovskoye Rural Settlement of Solnechnogorsky District in Moscow Oblast;